Gidske Anderson (4 November 1921 – 19 October 1993) was a Norwegian journalist, editor and author.

Biography
She was born in Oslo, Norway. Her parents were Yngve Anderson (1892-–1981) and Gidske Halvorsen (1895–1985).  She studied at Aars og Voss skole  and graduated from the State Teachers' School (Statens teiknelärarskole) at Notodden. She worked for the Norwegian Broadcasting Corporation (NRK) and then the newspaper Arbeiderbladet (1954–64) in Paris. From 1964 to 1967 she was a freelance journalist in the United States. She became editor of the foreign affairs section of Arbeiderbladet from 1967 to 1972, and then was Paris correspondent for NRK from 1973 to 1975. 

She debuted as an author with Mørk fest in 1962. As author, Anderson wrote books of poetry, memoirs and biographies. She  published her autobiography Det hendte meg in 1983 and completed biographies on both  Norwegian Foreign Minister  Halvard Lange (1902–1970)   and  Norwegian Prime Minister Trygve Bratteli  (1910–1984) as well as of Nobel Prize-winning novelist Sigrid Undset (1882–1949).

In 1962, she received the Narvesen Prize (Narvesen prisen) for her journalism in the press and broadcasting.
She sat on the Norwegian Nobel Committee from 1981 to 1993, and chaired it in part of 1990 following the death of Egil Aarvik (1912-1990). The remaining period she was the committee's first deputy chair.

She died during 1993 and was buried at Vestre gravlund in Oslo.

Selected works
Mørk fest, 1962
Mennesker i Paris, 1964
En reise i Amerika, 1968
De ytre banker, 1971
Veier og vandringer, 1972
Når diktning blir forbrytelse, 1976
Fjære, 1977
Fra stalinisme til sosialdemokrati, 1979
Krigene etter krigen, 1980
Halvard Lange — portrett av en nordmann, 1981
Det hendte meg, 1983
Trygve Bratteli, 1984
Bedre kan jeg ikke fare ..., 1987
Sigrid Undset. Et liv, 1991

References

1921 births
1993 deaths
Journalists from Oslo
20th-century Norwegian writers
Chairpersons of the Norwegian Nobel Committee
Burials at Vestre gravlund
20th-century Norwegian journalists